Badminton is a sport contested at the Summer Olympic Games. Badminton was first held as a demonstration sport at the 1972 Summer Olympics, and was an exhibition sport at the 1988 Summer Olympics; the men's and women's singles and doubles have been held at every Summer Olympics since the 1992 Summer Olympics. The mixed doubles badminton tournament started in the 1996 Summer Olympics.

The Badminton World Federation (BWF) rankings are used to determine the qualification of the players for the tournament. Nations can enter a maximum of two players each in the men's and women's singles if both are ranked in the world's top 16; otherwise, one quota place until the roster of thirty-eight players has been completed. Similar regulations also apply to the players competing in the doubles, as the NOCs (National Olympic Committees) can enter a maximum of two pairs if both are ranked in the top eight, while the remaining NOCs are entitled to one until the quota of 16 highest-ranked pairs is filled. The host nation, if it has not already qualified two competitors, receives at least either two singles players or one pair.

Gao Ling is the all-time leader for the most Olympic medals in badminton, with two gold, one silver, and one bronze; Fu Haifeng (two gold, one silver), Zhang Nan, Zhao Yunlei and Kim Dong-moon (two gold, one bronze) each, Gil Young-ah and Chen Long (one of each) and Lee Chong Wei (three silver) are second for the most medals in badminton, each with three. Fu Haifeng, Gao Ling, Ge Fei, Gu Jun, Kim Dong-moon, Lin Dan, Zhang Jun, Zhang Nan, Zhang Ning and Zhao Yunlei are the all-time leaders for the most gold medal wins, with two. In the 1992 Summer Olympics, future married couple Susi Susanti and Alan Budikusuma won Indonesia their first ever Olympic gold medals since their first Olympic participation in 1952, while brothers Jalani and Razif Sidek were the first Malaysian Olympic medalists since Malaysia first participated the 1964 Summer Olympics. Mia Audina won her first silver in the 1996 Olympics representing Indonesia, but won her second silver in the 2004 Summer Olympics with the Netherlands, the only badminton medalist to ever win for two different countries. In the 2000 Summer Olympics, China swept the women's doubles tournament, winning all three medals, making it the only sweep in Olympic badminton history. Indonesia also did so in the 1992 Olympics men's singles tournament, but there was no bronze medal match in that Games so the medal was shared with Danish player Thomas Stuer-Lauridsen. In the 2012 Summer Olympics, China became the first country to win all five disciplines' gold medal in history, and as of 2020 the only to sweep all five in the same Games. Indonesia became the second to achieve this feat, stretching from its first gold in the 1992 women's singles to 2020 women's doubles.

As of the 2020 Summer Olympics, China has been the most successful nation in badminton, winning 47 medals; 33 of them were from the women's singles and doubles and mixed doubles tournaments. Indonesia (21 medals) and South Korea (20 medals) are the only other nations to have more than nine medals. As many as 121 medals (39 gold, 39 silver, and 43 bronze) have been awarded to 153 medalists from 12 NOCs. There were four additional bronze medal winners in the 1992 Summer Olympics because no bronze medal matches were played in any of the four tournaments.


Men

Men's singles

Men's doubles

Women

Women's singles

Women's doubles

Mixed

Mixed doubles

Statistics

Medal leaders

Medal table
Updated after the 8th edition (2020)

Medal distribution
Updated after the 8th edition (2020)

Men's singles

Men's doubles

Women's singles

Women's doubles

Mixed doubles

Medals per year
Updated after the 8th edition (2020)

See also
 BWF World Championships

References
General
 
 
 
 
 
Specific

Badminton
Medalists

Olympics